Terbium silicide is a chemical compound of the rare earth metal terbium with silicon having chemical formula TbSi2. It is a gray solid first described in detail in the late 1950s.

The metallic resistivity and low Schottky barrier of TbSi2 (on n-type doped silicon) make it a potential candidate for applications such as infrared detectors, ohmic contacts, magnetoresistive devices, and thermoelectric devices.

It exhibits antiferromagnetism at 16K.

References

Transition metal silicides
Terbium compounds